Herbert Masaryk (1 May 1880, Vienna – 15 March 1915, Prague) was a Czech Post-Impressionist painter; son of the future founder and President of Czechoslovakia, Tomáš Masaryk, and his American-born wife, Charlotte Garrigue.

Biography 
After displaying an early talent for painting, he studied in Prague, Florence (1900-1901) and Antwerp (1901-1902), but remained largely self-taught. He was influenced by Impressionism, Expressionism, the  Vienna Secession and the fairy tale illustrations of Hanuš Schwaiger. His work consists primarily of portraits and landscapes.

He was a good amateur hockey player in his youth, and played for HC Slavia Praha from 1900 to 1901, during its first season. In 2013, a hockey trophy was named for his father, who provided and presented the first national trophy in 1924.

In 1905. he became good friends with the painter Antonín Slavíček and lived with his family in Kameničky. After Slavíček's suicide in 1910, Masaryk married his widow, Bohumila, and adopted his children.

He died of typhus; apparently contracted while working with Galician war refugees in Borová and Polička. In 1993, a major retrospective was organized by the "". It was opened by President Vaclav Havel and Masaryk's two surviving daughters and drew over 50,000 attendees.

Of his approximately 300 paintings, almost 100 are unaccounted for. Many of these were probably lost just after his death when his sister, Alice, was arrested by the Austrian government and her property was seized in an effort to discover hidden political writings by their father.

Selected paintings

References

Further reading
 Petr Wittlich and Eva Kosáková, Herbert Masaryk : život a dílo : (1880-1915) (exhibition catalog), Tvorba, 1993 
 Kristýna Michlová, Herbert Masaryk (1880-1915), (Bachelor's Thesis), Charles University. Full text and reviews online
. Masaryk a legie (TGM and legions), váz. kniha, 219 str., vydalo nakladatelství Paris Karviná, Žižkova 2379 (734 01 Karviná) ve spolupráci s Masarykovým demokratickým hnutím (Masaryk Democratic Movement in Prague), 2019,

External links 

"Herbert Masaryk – der „missratene Sohn“ des Staatsgründers" @ Radio Prague

1880 births
1915 deaths
20th-century Czech painters
Landscape painters
Czech people of American descent
Czech people of French descent
Czech portrait painters
Artists from Vienna
Deaths from typhus
Czech male painters
20th-century Czech male artists
Sportspeople from the Austro-Hungarian Empire
Austro-Hungarian painters